Le prix Ève-Delacroix is one of the prizes bestowed by the Académie française. The award which was established in 1977 by the Ève-Delacroix foundation is intended "for the author of a work (essay or novel) combining literary qualities with the meaning of the dignity of man and the responsibilities of the writer".

Laureates 
Source:
 2016 - Gilles Thomas, Les Catacombes. Histoire du Paris souterrain
 2014 - Marcel Cohen, Sur la scène intérieure. Faits
 2013 - Michèle Audin, Une vie brève
 2012 - Ali Magoudi, Un sujet français and Gang Peng, Artiste du peuple (silver medal)
 2011 - Michel Meulders, William James (silver medal) and Olivia Rosenthal, 
 2010 - Étienne de Montety, L’Article de la mort (silver medal) and Eugène Green, La Bataille de Roncevaux
 2009 - Stéphane Hoffmann, Des garçons qui tremblent and Arnaud Teyssier, Charles Péguy. Une humanité française (silver medal)
 2008 - Sara Yalda, Regard persan, 
 2007 - Eugène Ébodé, Silikani (silver medal) and Jacqueline Risset, Traduction et mémoire poétique
 2006 - Jean-Paul Sermain, Le Conte de fées du classicisme aux Lumières
 2005 - Roger Kempf, L’indiscrétion des frères Goncourt
 2004 - Jacqueline Duchêne, Place Royale
 2003 - André Burgos, Les cours d’adultes de Pierre Sacreste, instituteur de la IIIe République (silver medal) and Jean-Paul Mulot, Le Prince qui voulait être jardinier, Charles-Joseph de Ligne
 2002 - Julie Wolkenstein, Colloque sentimental
 2001 - Marcel Schneider, Les Gardiens du secret
 2000 - Roger Bichelberger, Celle qui gardait toute chose en son cœur and Véronique Gély-Ghédira, La Nostalgie du moi (silver medal)
 1999 - Marcel Gauchet, La Religion dans la démocratie. Parcours de la laïcité and Abdallah Laroui, Islam et Histoire
 1998 - Maurice Herzog, L’Autre Annapurna
 1997 - Claude Kayat, L’Armurier and Claude Pichois, Auguste Poulet-Malassis, l’éditeur de Baudelaire (silber medal)
 1996 - Philippe Le Guillou, Livres des guerriers d’or and Robert Rousse, Lumière sur la voie (bronze medal)
 1995 - Hélène Guisan-Démétriadès, La Tierce présence
 1994 - Jean Schmitt, Mes dix mille plus belles années
 1993 - Patrick Erouart-Siad, Océanie
 1992 - Christian Combaz, Bal dans la maison du pendu, and all his work as novelist
 1991 - Hugues de Montalembert, À perte de vue
 1990 - Jean-Marc Varaut, Poètes en prison
 1989 - Édouard Georges Mac-Avoy, Le plus clair de mon temps
 1988 - Roger d'Amécourt, Le mariage de Mademoiselle de la Verne
 1987 - Philippe Seringe, Les symboles dans l’art, dans les religions et dans la vie de tous les jours
 1986 - Michel Breitman, Le témoin de poussière
 1985 - Roger Chapelain-Midy, Comme le sable entre les doigts
 1984 - Louis Nucéra, Le kiosque à musique
 1983 - Paul Savatier, Le Photographe
 1982 - Georges Suffert, Un royaume pour une tombe
 1981 - not attributed
 1980 - Florence Delay, L’Insuccès de la fête
 1979 - Philippe Beaussant, Le Biographe
 1978 - Jean Lods, La part de l’eau
 1977 - Yves Bertho, Ingrid
 1960 - Jean Lartéguy, Les Centurions

References

External links 
 Prix Eve Delacroix on LivresHebdo.fr

French literary awards
Awards established in 1977
1977 establishments in France